Count Henry of Nassau-Siegen (9 August 1611 – 27 October/7 November 1652), official titles: Graf zu Nassau, Katzenelnbogen, Vianden und Diez, Herr zu Beilstein, was a count from the House of Nassau-Siegen, a cadet branch of the Ottonian Line of the House of Nassau. He served the Republic of the United Netherlands in diplomatic missions, as an officer in the Dutch States Army, and as governor of Hulst.

Biography
He was baptised on 29 September, also at Siegen Castle. He was educated at the court of the Electoral Palatinate in Heidelberg and the Bohemian court in Prague. With the ‘Winter King’ (Elector Frederick V of the Palatinate, King of Bohemia) Henry fled from Prague to The Hague and studied with the King’s eldest son Frederick Henry since 14 September 1623 at Leiden University.

In service of the Dutch Republic
Henry became captain of a infantry company in the Dutch States Army on 27 November 1632. On 2 January 1636 he became lieutenant colonel and on 23 March 1647 colonel of the Northern Holland regiment. On 20 April 1640 he also became ritmeester. He was governor of Hulst since 1645.

The Dutch Republic repeatedly called on Henry for diplomatic missions. In 1638, in Paris he delivered the congratulations of the States General of the Netherlands on the occasion of the birth of the Dauphin of France (later King Louis XIV), and requested King Louis XIII on behalf of Prince Frederick Henry of Orange to stand as godparent at the baptism of the latter’s son Henry Louis.

In 1643 Henry travelled to Scandinavia. In February he attended the marriage of Count Oxenstierna (a cousin of the Swedish Lord High Chancellor Axel Oxenstierna) in Stockholm. At the court of Queen Christina of Sweden, Henry met his sister Amalia and her husband, field marshal Herman Wrangel af Salmis, governor of Livonia. With a large entourage, Henry travelled to Danzig and Warsaw and returned to the Dutch Republic via Vienna. The purpose of this diplomatic journey has remained unknown. But from a letter it is known that King Władysław IV of Poland, despite his distrust of everything that came from Prince Frederick Henry of Orange, was pleased to have Henry at his court as a Dutch envoy.

In 1649 Henry undertook another journey to the Nordic countries, the purpose of which also remains unknown. This journey earned him the high honour of the Danish Order of the Elephant. The later famous scientist and inventor Christiaan Huygens, whose knowledge of the law in the ‘Deensche saecke’ (‘Danish affairs’) would be of use to Henry, accompanied him as a secretary. Huygens gave interesting accounts of Henry’s experiences at the Danish royal court. The Danish-Norwegian Queen Sophia Amalia took on the sponsorship of Henry’s daughter Sophia Amalia, born in 1650.

On behalf of the House of Nassau, Henry and his brothers John Maurice and George Frederick were witnesses at the marriage of Count William Frederick of Nassau-Diez, the stadtholder of Friesland, and Countess Albertine Agnes of Nassau in Kleve on 2 May 1652.

Succession dispute for the County of Nassau-Siegen
The third will and testament of Count John VII ‘the Middle’ of 1621 bequeathed John Maurice and his younger brothers from their father’s second marriage the district of Freudenberg, some villages in the Haingericht and a third part of the administration of the city of Siegen. For the eldest son from the first marriage, John ‘the Younger’, only one third of the county was provided for in this will. On 6 August 1621, he was informed of this, with a precise statement of the reasons that had led his father to take this step. On 9 May 1623, i.e. not until two years later, John ‘the Younger’ protested against this with a letter from Frankfurt to the councillors of Siegen. In the meantime he had not been idle and had not hesitated to denounce his father to the Emperor. At the time of his letter of protest he was certainly already aware of the Poenale mandatum cassatorium, which Emperor Ferdinand II officially issued some time later, on 27 June 1623, informing John ‘the Middle’ that at the time of making his third will as a fellow combatant of the outlawed ‘Winter King’ he was not entitled to make a will. He had to revoke it and answer to an imperial court within two months. It seems that John ‘the Younger’ then shrank from having the imperial decree delivered to his seriously ill father.

John ‘the Middle’ died at Siegen Castle on 27 September 1623. None of the three sons mentioned in the will were present at the death of their father. On 13 October William and John Maurice arrived in Siegen, and on 26 October John ‘the Younger’. Everyone knew that there would be a dispute at the reading of the will on 11 December 1623. John ‘the Younger’ had the imperial decree read out, and when his brothers demurred, he said as he stood up: ‘Der Kaiser wird uns scheiden!’ (‘The Emperor will part us!’). He had taken the precaution of obtaining a further imperial decree on 20 November 1623 against Countess Dowager Margaret and her sons, in which the Emperor strictly forbade impeding John’s assumption of government, his taking possession of the land and his inauguration. On 12 January 1624, John ‘the Younger’ was able to accept the homage from the town of Siegen but only because he beforehand had secretly let a squadron of selected horsemen into the town through the castle gate (that is, not through a city gate) in a heavy snowstorm, so that they could not be seen or heard by the town guards.

John ‘the Younger’ thus received the entire inheritance, and the provisions of the will made in favour of William and John Maurice remained a dead letter. With the exception of John Maurice and George Frederick, the younger brothers accepted only modest appanages. Henceforth, until 1645, the county of Nassau-Siegen had two governments, one in Siegen, the other in Hilchenbach. However, for a short period (1632–1635) this situation underwent a temporary change: during the Thirty Years’ War, his brothers, who were fighting on the Protestant side, rebelled against John ‘the Younger’.

Count Louis Henry of Nassau-Dillenburg entered the service of King Gustavus II Adolphus of Sweden on 1 December 1631, who had landed in Germany on 24 June 1630 to intervene in favour of the Protestants in the Thirty Years’ War. Countess Dowager Margaret, through the mediation of Louis Henry, turned to Gustavus Adolphus and asked for help against the machinations of her stepson John ‘the Younger’. On 14 February 1632 the Swedish king sent an order from Frankfurt to Louis Henry to provide military support for his first cousin John Maurice. Louis Henry then occupied the city of Siegen with his regiment of Dutch and Swedish soldiers. One day later, on 29 February, John Maurice and his brother Henry arrived in Siegen. Just as John ‘the Younger’ had kept his cavalry in reserve eight years earlier, now John Maurice and Henry, supported by the presence of the Swedish regiment, negotiated with the citizens, who felt bound by the oath they had sworn to John ‘the Younger’. On 4 March, after long and difficult negotiations, the citizens paid homage to John Maurice and Henry. John Maurice obtained for himself not only the Freudenberg district, which his father had intended for him in the will of 1621, but also Netphen, which had been intended for John ‘the Younger’ in the same will. William was not only confirmed in the possession of Hilchenbach, but also received  and Krombach, as stipulated in his father’s will. The city of Siegen paid homage to William and John Maurice only, who only in 1635 re-admitted their elder brother John ‘the Younger’ into co-sovereignty. However, the latter soon restored the old order: in 1636, he again became the sole owner of his father’s property, with the exception of Hilchenbach, which he left to William, and he again governed the city of Siegen alone. John Maurice was again excluded from the county’s sovereignty. However, in 1642 he inherited the territory from his brother William in accordance with his father’s will.

John ‘the Younger’ died in Ronse on 27 July 1638. His only son John Francis Desideratus was born in Nozeroy on 28 July 1627. His mother acted as regent until his marriage in 1651. He made several attempts to obtain the whole Siegerland. In 1646 he visited the Emperor in Vienna to protest against his uncle John Maurice’s seizure of the county. On 22 January 1645, after his return from Brazil, the latter, with his brothers George Frederick and Henry and an 80-man entourage, had forcibly occupied Siegen Castle and on 15 February had received the renewed homage from the citizens, albeit this time only for two thirds of the county. In order to end the constant dispute, John Maurice wanted to adhere strictly to his father’s will of 1621 and leave his nephew John Francis Desideratus the one third that was due to him. Already before his departure to Brazil, on 25 October 1635, he had explicitly authorised his subjects to recognise the then still living John ‘the Younger’ as co-ruler. In 1645 John Maurice relinquished his rights to the Freudenberg district, granted by the will of 1621, in favour of his brother George Frederick. John Francis Desideratus was unsuccessful with the Emperor in Vienna, and two years later, at the Congress of Westphalia, Emperor Ferdinand III ratified the fiercely contested 1621 will of John ‘the Middle’. This left John Francis Desideratus only the Catholic third part, which is still known today as Johannland. John Maurice held both the other thirds in his hand, because his brother William had already died and left him his third part, and George Frederick had ceded all his rights to John Maurice in 1649. It was therefore the latter who continued to administer the Freudenberg district.

Death, burial and reburial
Henry died in Hulst on 27 October/7 November 1652. He was first buried in Terborg.

Marriage and issue

From the marriage of Henry and Mary Magdalene the following children were born:
 Ernestine (Wisch Castle, Terborg, 15 November 1647 – Hulst, October 1652).
 Fürst William Maurice (Wisch Castle, Terborg, 18/28 January 1649 – Nassauischer Hof, Siegen, 23 January 1691Jul.), succeeded his uncle John Maurice as Fürst of Nassau-Siegen in 1679. Married at Schaumburg Castle on 6 February 1678Jul. to Princess Ernestine Charlotte of Nassau-Schaumburg (Schaumburg Castle, 20 May 1662Jul. – Nassauischer Hof, Siegen, 21 February 1732).
 Sophie Amalie (Wisch Castle, Terborg, 10 January 1650Jul. – Mitau, 15/25 November 1688), married in The Hague on 5 October 1675Greg. to Duke Frederick Casimir of Courland (6 July 1650 – 22 January 1698).
 Frederick Henry (Wisch Castle, Terborg, 11 November 1651 – Roermond, 4 September 1676), was a colonel in the Dutch States Army.
The sons William Maurice and Frederick Henry were adopted by their uncle John Maurice of Nassau-Siegen after the death of their father. William Maurice, Sophie Amalie and Frederick Henry were elevated to the rank and title of prince(ss) in 1664.

Ancestors

Notes

References

Sources
 
 
  (1911). "Frederik Hendrik, Friedrich Heinrich". In:  en  (redactie), Nieuw Nederlandsch Biografisch Woordenboek (in Dutch). Vol. Eerste deel. Leiden: A.W. Sijthoff. p. 902.
  (1911). "Hendrik, Heinrich". In:  en  (redactie), Nieuw Nederlandsch Biografisch Woordenboek (in Dutch). Vol. Eerste deel. Leiden: A.W. Sijthoff. p. 1075–1076.
  (1911). "Willem Maurits, Wilhelm Moritz". In:  en  (redactie), Nieuw Nederlandsch Biografisch Woordenboek (in Dutch). Vol. Eerste deel. Leiden: A.W. Sijthoff. p. 1578.
 
 
 
 
 
 
 
 
 
 
 
 
 
  (2004). "Die Fürstengruft zu Siegen und die darin von 1669 bis 1781 erfolgten Beisetzungen". In:  u.a. (Redaktion), Siegener Beiträge. Jahrbuch für regionale Geschichte (in German). Vol. 9. Siegen: Geschichtswerkstatt Siegen – Arbeitskreis für Regionalgeschichte e.V. p. 183–202.
 
 
  (1979). "Genealogische gegevens". In:  (red.), Nassau en Oranje in de Nederlandse geschiedenis (in Dutch). Alphen aan den Rijn: A.W. Sijthoff. p. 40–44, 224–228. .
 
 
  (1882). Het vorstenhuis Oranje-Nassau. Van de vroegste tijden tot heden (in Dutch). Leiden: A.W. Sijthoff/Utrecht: J.L. Beijers.

External links

 Nassau. In: Medieval Lands. A prosopography of medieval European noble and royal families, compiled by Charles Cawley.
 Nassau Part 5. In: An Online Gotha, by Paul Theroff.

|-

1611 births
1652 deaths
German Calvinist and Reformed Christians
German diplomats
German military officers
German people of the Eighty Years' War
Henry of Nassau-Siegen
Military personnel of the Eighty Years' War
Military personnel from Siegen
17th-century German people